Bernie Thomas (17 February 1918 – 14 March 1979) was a Guyanese cricketer. He played in four first-class matches for British Guiana from 1938 to 1946.

See also
 List of Guyanese representative cricketers

References

External links
 

1918 births
1979 deaths
Guyanese cricketers
Guyana cricketers
Sportspeople from Georgetown, Guyana